Coval is a surname. 
It is the Romanian form of the surname Kowal/Koval, meaning "forger" or "blacksmith" in Slavic languages.
Portuguese surname, typically in the form of "do Coval" literally meaning "of Coval"/"from Coval".

Notable people with this surname include:
Kevin Coval, American poet
Nicolae Coval, Moldavian SSR politician

References

Portuguese-language surnames
Romanian-language surnames
East Slavic-language surnames